Charlemagne (742/747–814) was King of the Franks from 768 to 814 and Emperor of the Holy Roman Empire from 800 to 814.

Charlemagne may also refer to:

People
 Peter II, Count of Savoy (1203–1268), called "the Little Charlemagne"
 Charlemagne Péralte (1886–1919), Haitian nationalist leader
 Manno Charlemagne (1948–2017), Haitian musician, politician
 Charlemagne Tower (1809–1889), American mining developer
 Charlemagne Palestine (born 1947), American artist
 Diane Charlemagne (1964–2015), British vocalist
 Charlemagne Anyamah (born 1938), French athlete
 Jean Armand Charlemagne (1753–1838), French dramatic author
 Charlamagne tha God (born 1978), American radio personality (Lenard McKelvey)
 Maxime Charlemagne (born 1974), athlete from Saint Lucia

Arts and entertainment
 Charlemagne (film), a 1933 French comedy drama film directed by Pierre Colombier
 Charlemagne (band), a band from Wisconsin
 Charlemagne (songwriting team), a songwriting team with Motown
 "Charlemagne" (song), a 2016 song by English indie group Blossoms
 "Kid Charlemagne", a 1976 song by the rock group Steely Dan
 Pèlerinage de Charlemagne, an Old French epic poem
 Charlemagne (comics), a comic book series
 Charlemagne: By the Sword and the Cross, a 2010 symphonic metal concept album by Christopher Lee
 Charlemagne: The Omens of Death, a 2013 heavy metal concept album by Christopher Lee
 Charlemagne, le prince à cheval, a 1993 television miniseries
 The Charlemagne Pursuit, a 2008 novel
 The Coronation of Charlemagne, a 1517 painting
 Charlemagne, a Simon Kidgits bird character developed by Simon Brand Ventures

Places
 Charlemagne building, a Brussels high-rise of the European Commission
 Charlemagne, Quebec, an off-island suburb of Montreal, Canada
 Lycée Charlemagne, located in the Marais quarter of Paris, France
 Villiers-Charlemagne, a commune of France
 Cours Charlemagne, a street of Lyon
 Patinoire Charlemagne, an ice-rink of Lyon
 Rue Charlemagne, a street of Paris

Military
 French ship Charlemagne, ships called Charlemagne
 French battleship Charlemagne, an 1895 battleship called Charlemagne
 Charlemagne-class battleship, a class of French battleship
 French ship Charlemagne (1852), a ship-of-the-line called Charlemagne
 33rd Waffen Grenadier Division of the SS Charlemagne

Honors
 Order of Charlemagne, a decoration of Andorra
 Charlemagne Prize, a prestigious award by the German city of Aachen

Other uses
 Charlemagne (wine), a wine called Charlemagne
 Corton-Charlemagne, a wine and vineyard of Burgundy

See also
 Charlamagne tha God (born 1980)